Philippe Michel may refer to:

 Philippe Michel (economist) (1937–2004)
 Philippe Michel (number theorist) (born 1969)
 Philippe Michel (boxer)
 Philippe Michel-Kleisbauer, French politician
 Prince Philippe Michel of Ligne (born 1977), a Prince of Ligne